Deg Xinag (Deg Hitan) is a Northern Athabaskan language spoken by the Deg Hitʼan peoples of the GASH region. The GASH region consists of the villages of Grayling, Anvik, Shageluk, and Holy Cross along the lower Yukon River in Interior Alaska. The language is severely endangered; out of an ethnic population of approximately 250 people, only 14 people still speak the language.

The language was referred to as Ingalik by Osgood (1936). While this term sometimes still appears in the literature, it is today considered pejorative. The word "Ingalik" is from the Yupʼik Eskimo language: , meaning "Indian".

 (Their Stories of Long Ago), a collection of traditional folk tales in Deg Xinag by the elder Belle Deacon, was published in 1987 by the Alaska Native Language Center. A literacy manual with accompanying audiotapes was published in 1993.

Dialects 
There are two main dialects: Yukon and Kuskokwim. The Yukon dialect (Yukon Deg Xinag, Yukon Ingalik) is the traditional language of the villages of the Lower Yukon River (Anvik, Shageluk and Holy Cross). As of 2009, there are no longer any speakers living in Anvik and Holy Cross. The other dialect (Kuskokwim Deg Xinag, Kuskokwim Ingalik) is the traditional language of the settlements of Middle Kuskokwim.

Phonology

Consonants 
Here is the list of consonant sounds in Deg Xinag, including their pronunciation in IPA and their representations in Deg Xinag orthography in brackets:

Vowels 

Examples 
  - airplane
  - animal
  - bear (lit. 'big animal')
  - children
  - day
  - doctor, nurse
  - fish
  - dog
  - my dog
  - her dog
  - mammoth
  - doll (lit. 'little person')
  - door
  - earthquake
  - my father
  - her father
  - house
  - snow
  - iron, metal
  - mountain
  - Indian ice cream
  (in Anvik); niq'asrt'ay (in Shageluk) - fox
  - in the morning
  - Hello, how are you?
  - one
  - two
  - three
  - four
  - eleven

References

External links
Alaskan Native Language Center.
Deg Xinag - Language of the Deg Hit'an
 Deg Xinag (ANLC)
 Deg Xinag Resources at the Alaska Native Language Archive (ANLA)
 Rescuing a language: College course unites far-flung students and elders in an effort to save Deg Xinag
 Word-Lists of the Athabaskan, Yup'ik and Alutiiq Languages by Lt. Laurence Zagoskin, 1847 (containing Deg Xinag on pages 3–8)
 The Order for Morning Prayer, translated by John Wight Chapman in 1896, digitized by Richard Mammana 2010
 Degexit'an basic lexicon at the Global Lexicostatistical Database
 Deg Xinag language, alphabet and pronunciation

Further reading

Hargus, Sharon. (2000). The Qualifier Prefixes in Yukon Deg Xinag (Ingalik). International Journal of American Linguistics, Vol. 66, No. 1, pp. 1–21.
Hargus, Sharon. (2008). Deg Xinag lateral affricates: Phonetic and historical perspectives. Poster presented at annual meeting of Society for the Study of the Indigenous Languages of the Americas, Chicago.
Kari, James. (1978). Deg Xinag (Ingalik) Noun Dictionary. Fairbanks, AK: Alaska Native Language Center.
Leonard, Beth R. (2007). Deg Xinag oral traditions: Reconnecting Indigenous language and education through traditional narratives (Doctoral dissertation).
Osgood, Cornelius. (1936). The Distribution of the Northern Athapaskan Indians. (Yale University Publications in Anthropology, no. 7). New Haven: Yale University.
Taff, Alice. (1997). Learning ancestral languages by telephone: Creating situations for language use [∗Ingalik; Telephone Conversation]. Teaching Indigenous Languages. Fairbanks: University of Alaska. https://files.eric.ed.gov/fulltext/ED415063.pdf.

Deg Xitʼan
Northern Athabaskan languages
Indigenous languages of Alaska
Indigenous languages of the North American Subarctic
Endangered Dené–Yeniseian languages
Official languages of Alaska